Gytha Lodge is a playwright, novelist and writer for Video games and screen, best known for the DCI Jonah Sheens series of novels.

Education 
She attended King's Ely, in Cambridgeshire, the University of Cambridge, reading English, and the University of East Anglia, gaining an MA in Creative writing.

Personal life 
Lodge lives in Cambridge with her son.

Bibliography

DCI Jonah Sheens series 

 She Lies in Wait (March 2019)
 Watching from the Dark (February 2020)
 Lie Beside Me (March 2021)
 Little Sister (April 2022)
 A Killer in the Family (April 2023)

Recognition 
Her first book, She Lies in Wait, is a Sunday Times Bestseller and was recommended by the Richard & Judy Book Club.

References 

1984 births
Living people
21st-century British writers
People educated at King's Ely
Alumni of Corpus Christi College, Cambridge
Alumni of the University of East Anglia
British mystery writers